Visakha Institute of Engineering and Technology  (VSPT) is an educational institution located in Narava, Visakhapatnam, Andhra Pradesh was established in 2008 by Varaha Lakhmi Narasimha Swamy Educational Trust.

References

External links

Universities and colleges in Visakhapatnam
Engineering colleges in Andhra Pradesh
Educational institutions established in 2008
2008 establishments in Andhra Pradesh